Arostegui or Aróstegui is a surname. Notable people with the surname include:

Alfonso Clemente de Aróstegui (1698-1774), Spanish bishop, writer, lawyer and diplomat
Consuelo Luz Arostegui, American singer
Gonzalo de Quesada y Aróstegui (1868-1915), Cuban diplomat
Juan Arostegui (born 1980), Argentine soccer player
Manuel de Aróstegui Sáenz de Olamendi (1758–1813), Spanish politician
María de las Mercedes Adam de Aróstegui (1873-1957), Cuban pianist and composer 
Xabier López-Arostegui (born 1997), Spanish basketball player